Koh-Lanta: Thaïlande is the 15th season of the French version of Survivor, Koh-Lanta. This season takes place in the Ko Yao District in Thailand where 21 contestants survive for 40 days on a deserted island to try and win €100 000. The main twist this season is that everyone starts off on a single beach for the first day. The next day, the contestants have to decide which two will stay on the island until after the first tribal council. The island later became a place where each tribe had to send one of their members to be exiled, missing the immunity challenge but also tribal council. On the island, there are immunity collars that the contestants can find that they can play at tribal council and have all votes against them removed; sending the person with the second most votes home. The season aired on TF1 from 12 February until 27 May 2016 where Wendy Gervois won against Pascal Salviani in a close 6-5 vote.

Contestants

Future appearances
Cassandre Girard and Pascal Salviani later returned to compete in Koh-Lanta: Le Combat des Héros. Karima Neggaz returned for Koh-Lanta: La Légende.

Challenges

References

External links

Koh-Lanta seasons
2016 French television seasons
Television shows filmed in Thailand